Rosie's Gaming Emporium, commonly called Rosie's, is a chain of gambling parlors in the U.S. state of Virginia, owned by Churchill Downs, Inc. and affiliated with its Colonial Downs racetrack. The Rosie's brand was established in 2019. As of 2022, there are six Rosie's locations throughout Virginia with one each in New Kent, Vinton, Richmond, Hampton, and Dumfries, as well as a location branded as Rosie's Game Room in Collinsville. Two more locations have begun construction—one in Emporia and a $389-million casino resort in Dumfries called The Rose Gaming Resort, which is planned to be the first casino resort in Northern Virginia.

Rosie's parlors do not feature any poker tables or traditional slot machines, but rather slot-like machines for horse betting based on archived horse races called historical race wagering.

History
The first Rosie's location was opened within the Colonial Downs horse racing track complex in New Kent on April 23, 2019. Three independent Rosie's locations also opened up later in 2019, with the Vinton location opening on May 9, the Richmond location on July 1, and the Hampton location on October 29.

In November 2020 construction work on the 5th Rosie's Gaming Emporium in Dumfries began, and the location opened on January 8, 2021. Later that year, in the community of Collinsville, Rosie's Gaming Emporium opened its first 'Game Room'-branded and 6th total location on July 22.

In 2022 Colonial Downs's parent company, Peninsula Pacific Entertainment, sold the bulk of its assets, including Rosie's and Colonial Downs, to Churchill Downs, Inc.

The Rose Gaming Resort
On February 15, 2021 a proposal was revealed by Colonial Downs for a $389 million Rosie's-branded casino resort called The Rose Gaming Resort, which would stand on the site of the Potomac Landfill in Dumfries and be the largest casino as well as the first casino resort in Northern Virginia. The Dumfries Town Council approved the project on September 21, 2021. Construction of the resort began in January 2022 as the landfill closed, with plans to open in late 2023 and total completion of the two phases expected in 2026. The resort will feature a 50,000-sq-ft gaming facility, 305 hotel rooms, 8 restaurants, a theater, and conference rooms, and the remaining unused 79 acres will be converted into a park.

References

2019 establishments in Virginia
Casinos in Virginia
Companies based in Virginia